Dalibor Damjanović (born 12 September 1977) is a Slovenian professional basketball coach.

Coaching career 
Damjanović started his coaching career in 2002 as an assistant coach for Triglav Kranj, where he worked for three seasons. For the 2005–06 season, he got promoted to their head coach. Between 2006 and 2008, Damjanović was an assistant coach for Anwil Włocławek under head coach Aleš Pipan. Later, he was the head coach for TCG Mercator Škofja Loka until the end of the 2009–10 season. Damjanović worked as an assistant coach for Helios Domžale under head coach Zmago Sagadin for three seasons, between 2011 and 2014. In the 2015–16 season, he was the head coach of the women's basketball club Ilirija.

In January 2016, Damjanović became an assistant coach for Krka. On 17 March 2021, Krka promoted Damjanović as the new head coach following departure of Vladimir Anzulović.

National team coaching career 
Damjanović was an assistant coach for the Slovenia national under-20 team at three FIBA U20 European Championship, between 2010 and 2012.

In July 2018, Damjanović the head coach of the Slovenia under-20 team that won the silver medal at the FIBA U20 European Championship Division B in Sofia, Bulgaria.

In November 2020, Damjanović was named an assistant coach for the Slovenia national team under Aleksander Sekulić. He was a coaching staff member at the 2020 Summer Olympics in Tokyo.

Career achievements 
As head coach
 Slovenian Cup winner: 1  (with Krka: 2020–21)
 2018 FIBA U20 European Championship Division B: 

As assistant coach
 ABA League Second Division champion: 1  (with Krka: 2017–18)
 Polish Cup winner: 1  (with Anwil Włocławek: 2006–07)
 Polish Supercup winner: 1  (with Anwil Włocławek: 2007–08)

References

External links 
 Dalibor Damjanović at aba-liga.com
 Dalibor Damjanovic at eurobasket.com
 Dalibor Damjanovic at fibaeurope.com

1977 births
Living people
KK Krka coaches
Slovenian expatriate basketball people in Poland
Slovenian basketball coaches
Sportspeople from Kranj
KK Helios Domžale coaches